Chelcie Claude Ross (born June 20, 1942) is an American character actor, most known for Above the Law, Major League, Basic Instinct, Bill & Ted's Bogus Journey, Hoosiers, Rudy, Trouble with the Curve  and The Ballad of Buster Scruggs. 

He served in Vietnam as an officer in the United States Air Force where he had been awarded a Bronze Star, and earned an MFA from the Dallas Theater Center. He left the Air Force in 1970.

Filmography

Film

Television

Other media
In 2007, Ross appeared, along with Sean Astin and Charles S. Dutton, in an episode of My Name Is Earl that was a homage to the film Rudy.  He played an appliance store manager whose relationship to Earl mirrors that of his relationship to Rudy.

In 2008, he played Beverly Weston in the National Theatre production of August: Osage County.

He also played a fictionalized Conrad Hilton in the award-winning series Mad Men.

In 2012 he appeared in Boss as the chief of the Chicago Police Department.

References

External links

1942 births
Living people
American male film actors
United States Air Force personnel of the Vietnam War
American male television actors
Male actors from Oklahoma City
United States Air Force officers